This is the list of state-funded schools, colleges and universities in the Philippines. The list includes national colleges and universities system, region-wide colleges and universities system, province-wide colleges and universities system, and specialized schools. This list does NOT include locally funded schools, colleges and universities. Population numbers include satellite campuses and are as of 2020.

References

External links
Top Schools in the Philippines (Directory)

 
Philippine Association of State Universities and Colleges
State colleges